This page lists vans currently in production (as of 2013) as well as past models. The list includes minivans, passenger vans and cargo vans.

Note: Many of the vehicles (both current and past) are related to other vehicles in the list. A vehicle listed as a 'past model' may still be in production in an updated form under a different name, it may be listed under that name in the 'currently in production' section. Also, some vehicles are sold under different marques in different geographical locations, therefore some vehicles may be listed more than once but usually link to the same page. Different states may also classify vehicles differently. What may be considered a van in one state, may not in another state. Example; The Dacia Lodgy is known as the Nissan Lodgy in the Philippines.

† = no longer in production

Hyundai
†Hyundai Entourage
†Hyundai Grace
†Hyundai Lavita/Matrix
Hyundai Starex
†Hyundai Trajet XG

Isuzu
†Isuzu Oasis
†Isuzu Como
†Isuzu Filly

Iveco
Iveco Daily

Jeep
†Fleetvan FJ-3, FJ-6, FJ-9

Jowett
†Jowett Bradford

Kia
Kia Bongo
Kia Carens/Rondo
Kia Carnival/Sedona
†Kia Carstar/Joice
†Kia Pregio

LDV
†LDV Pilot
†LDV Convoy
†LDV Cub
†(returned in 2009 as the Maxus V80)LDV Maxus

Leyland
†Leyland Sherpa

Lloyd
†Lloyd LT 400, 600

Luxgen
Luxgen M7

Mahindra
Mahindra Xylo

Mazda
†Mazda Bongo/Bongo Brawny
†Mazda Bongo Friendee
Mazda MPV

Mercedes-Benz
†Mercedes-Benz L319
†Mercedes-Benz T1
Mercedes-Benz T2
†Mercedes-Benz Vaneo
Mercedes-Benz Vario
Mercedes-Benz Vito
Mercedes-Benz Sprinter
Mercedes-Benz V-Class

Mercury
†Mercury Villager
†Mercury Monterey

Mitsubishi
†Mitsubishi Expo
†Mitsubishi Minica
†Mitsubishi Town Box
Mitsubishi L300

Morris
†Morris Cowley
†Morris Minor
†Morris J4

Nissan
†Datsun Cablight
†Datsun Litevan
Nissan AD
Nissan Atlas/Atlas Walkthrue/Atlas Loco/Atlas MAX
Nissan Bluebird van
Datsun/Nissan Cabstar
Nissan Cedric van
Prince Gloria van/Nissan Gloria van
†Nissan Cherry van
†Nissan Interstar
†Nissan Kubistar
Nissan NV200
Nissan NV300
Nissan NV350 Caravan
Nissan NV400
Nissan NV1500
Nissan NV2500
Nissan NV3500
†Nissan Prairie
Nissan Primastar
Nissan Quest
†Nissan S-Cargo
Nissan Serena
†Nissan Silkroad
†Nissan Skyline van
†Nissan Sunny van
†Nissan Vanette
Nissan Lodgy

Oldsmobile
†Oldsmobile Silhouette

Opel/Vauxhall
†Opel Astravan
†Opel Bedford Blitz
†Opel Blitz
Opel Combo
Opel Corsavan
†Opel Kadett Combo
†Opel Movano A/B
Opel Movano C
†Opel Sintra
Opel Vivaro

Peugeot
†Peugeot J 7, J 9
†Peugeot J5
Peugeot Boxer
Peugeot Expert
Peugeot Partner

Plymouth
†Plymouth Voyager

Proton
Proton Exora
†Proton Juara
Pyonghwa
Pyongwha Ppeokkugi

Pontiac
†Pontiac Montana
†Pontiac Trans Sport

Ram Trucks
Ram C/V
Ram ProMaster

Renault
†Renault Estafette
†Renault 4 F4 and F6
Renault Kangoo
Renault Trafic
Renault Master

Riga Autobus Factory
†RAF-251
†RAF-08
†RAF-10
†RAF-2203
†RAF-22031
†RAF-3311
†RAF-33111
†RAF-977

SAIC-GM-Wuling
Wuling Rongguang
Wuling Hongtu
Wuling Xingwang
†Liuzhou Wuling LZ 110
Wuling Dragon
Wuling City Breeze
Wuling Windside
Wuling Sunshine

Saturn
†Saturn Relay

SEAT
†SEAT Inca

SsangYong
†Istana
†Rodius/Stavic

Subaru
†Subaru 360 Comercial/Van
†Subaru Domingo
†Subaru Leone van
†Subaru Sambar

Suzuki
Suzuki Alto
†Suzuki Carry
†Suzuki Supercarry
Suzuki Every
†Autozam Scrum
†Bedford Rascal
†Holden Scurry
Maruti Versa
Suzuki Ertiga

Tatra
†Tatra 12
†Tatra Beta

Tempo
†Tempo Rapid
†Tempo Wiking
†Tempo Matador

Toyota
†Tyopet Coronaline/Corona van/Toyota Corona van
†Toyopet/Toyota Crown van
†Toyopet Masteline
†Toyota Carina van
†Toyota Corolla van
Toyota Dyna
Toyota Granvia
Toyota Hiace
Toyota Hiace Regius
Toyota Regius Ace
†Toyota Liteace
†Toyota Mark II van
Toyota Noah/Voxy
†Toyota Master Ace Surf Wagon / Van
Toyota ProAce
Toyota Previa
Toyota Probox
†Toyota Publica van
†Toyota Quick Delivery / Urban Supporter
Toyota Sienna
Toyota Succeed
Toyota ToyoAce
†Toyota TownAce
Toyota Coaster

Ulyanovsk Automobile Plant
UAZ-452
UAZ Simba

Vauxhall and Bedford
†Bedford Beagle
†Bedford CA
†Bedford CF
†Bedford Chevanne
Vauxhall Combo see Opel
Vauxhall Corsavan
†Vauxhall Astravan
†Vauxhall Rascal
Vauxhall Vivaro
†Vauxhall Movano 1/2
Vauxhall Movano 3

Volkswagen Commercial Vehicles
Volkswagen Caddy
Volkswagen Routan
†(T4) Transporter / Kombi / Caravelle / Eurovan / Mutlivan
(T5) Transporter / Eurovan / Kombi / Caravelle / Mutlivan
Volkswagen California
Volkswagen LT
Volkswagen Crafter
Volkswagen Type 2 ("VW Bus")

Alternative propulsion

Since light trucks are often operated in city traffic, hybrid electric models are very useful:
Dual-Drive Sprinter - Mercedes Van equipped with hybrid drive systems
Electric 35-50 q
Micro-Vett Hybrid Daily
Modec Van
Smith Electric Vehicles Edison Van

Wheelchair accessible

Some vans can be converted into wheelchair accessible vans for mobility impaired people.

The following vehicles may be used in yards or in historic city centres:
Aixam Mega
Alke' ATX
Graf Carello Transporter
Tasso Domino

References

Vans